The Tri-County News is a weekly newspaper based in Kiel, Wisconsin. It is published by Delta Publications.

The newspaper was founded when the New Holstein Reporter, Kiel Tri-County Record, and Chilton Spirit were combined.

The Tri-County News is primarily distributed in Calumet County, Manitowoc County, Sheboygan and Fond du Lac County. The newspaper is the official publication of the cities of Kiel, New Holstein, Kiel Area Schools, New Holstein Area Schools, and the towns of Schleswig, Russell, Meeme, and New Holstein.

Memberships
The newspaper is a member of the Wisconsin Newspapers Association, National Newspaper Association, and Inland Press Association.

References

Infobox, Page 2, May 28, 2006 "Tri County News"

External links
Official website

Calumet County, Wisconsin
Manitowoc County, Wisconsin
Newspapers published in Wisconsin